The 1954–55 Danish Ice Hockey Championship season was the first season of ice hockey in Denmark. Three teams participated in the final tournament, and Rungsted IK won the championship.

Jütland Regional Tournament
The Jütland Regional Tournament was contested on February 19 and 20, 1955 in Silkeborg.

Semifinal
Silkeborg SF - Horsens SF 2:1 OT

Final
Silkeborg SF - Esbjerg SK 6:2

Final tournament

References
 Michael Søvsø: Fra pionerånd til verdensklasse - Danmarks Ishockey Union i 60 år (2009)

External links
Season on eliteprospects.com

Danish
1954–55 in Danish ice hockey